The Government Junta of Bolivia (Spanish: Junta de Gobierno), officially known as the Governmental Junta of the Republic (Spanish: Junta Gubernativa de la República), or also as the Governmental Junta Charged with Supreme Command of the Nation (Spanish: Junta Gubernativa Encargada del Mando Supremo de la Nación), was a civil-military junta which ruled Bolivia from 14 January to 4 May 1861. It was chaired by a triumvirate of three men; two Bolivians and one Argentine: José María de Achá, Manuel Antonio Sánchez, and Ruperto Fernández, all of whom came to power after a coup d'état which ousted the government of José María Linares, the very president they had previously served under. The junta was dissolved on 4 May 1861 when the National Constituent Assembly elected Achá as the provisional president.

History

1861 coup d'état 

On 14 January 1861, Ruperto Fernández and José María de Achá, ministers of state in the government and war portfolios, joined by Prefect of La Paz Manuel Antonio Sánchez, rebelled against the president they had been serving under, launching a coup d'état which ousted José María Linares. In their manifesto to the nation, the newly formed junta justified its actions as a "regenerative revolution" against the dictatorship President Linares had imposed in 1858.

National Constituent Assembly 
Immediately on 15 January 1861, the junta released the call for the convocation of a constituent assembly. The legislature was tasked with drafting a new constitution, the seventh such charter in Bolivian history, and was to elect a provisional president from among the triumvirs. Legislative elections were carried out in what was considered to be a generally democratic manner, resulting in the establishment of a multi-party assembly with members "from all walks of life". Upon its installation at the Loreto chapel on 1 May, the junta officially ceased its executive functions and transferred them to the assembly, chaired by Adolfo Ballivián. The same day, the assembly redelegated command to the junta until it could finish deliberating on who would lead the provisional government.

Considering that Sánchez had died in April, the assembly was given the choice between Achá and Fernández. The fact that Fernández was of Argentine origin was a factor taken into account and the assembly opted to declare him Bolivian by birth. Nonetheless, on 4 May, the assembly elected Achá provisional president by a vote of 860–16.

Composition

Structural changes

References

Notes

Footnotes

Bibliography 

 
 
 

1861 establishments in Bolivia
1861 disestablishments in Bolivia
Military dictatorships
Cabinets established in 1861
Cabinets disestablished in 1861